Oncideres multicincta is a species of beetle in the family Cerambycidae. It was described by Dillon and Dillon in 1946. It is known from Brazil, Bolivia, French Guiana and Ecuador.

References

multicincta
Beetles described in 1946